Yazman is a tehsil located in Bahawalpur District, Punjab,  Pakistan. The city of Yazman is the headquarters of the tehsil which is administratively subdivided into 18 Union Councils.

It is largest Tehsil of Pakistan.
Famous areas of Yazman are Qila Darawar , Tailwala, Head Rajkan, Tera Hazar, 42 hazar, 42 ada. 
Villages in the area include Chak No 113/DNB , Chak No. 16 DNB, Chak No. 42 DB and Chak No 108/DNB. Chak 108/DNB has a Governmental Primary School and a private school named as Piyaam E Sahar Public School funded by an NGO named as PEF.

References

Tehsils of Bahawalpur District